There's Trouble Brewing is a 1937 detective novel by Cecil Day-Lewis, written under the pen name of Nicholas Blake. It is the third in a series of novels featuring the private detective Nigel Strangeways.

Synopsis
Strangeways is invited to the small town of Maiden Astbury to give a talk to the literary society on a book he has recently written on historic poetry. There he encounters the domineering and tyrannical owner of the local brewery Eustace Bunnett, who hires him to investigate the death of his pet dog Truffles in one of the brewery's copper vats. The very next day a body appearing to be Bunnett's turns up at the same spot.

References

Bibliography
 Reilly, John M. Twentieth Century Crime & Mystery Writers. Springer, 2015.
 Stanford, Peter. C Day-Lewis: A Life. A&C Black, 2007.

1937 British novels
Novels by Cecil Day-Lewis
British crime novels
Collins Crime Club books
Novels set in England
British detective novels
Novels about writers